Torremocha  is a municipality located in the province of Cáceres, in the autonomous community of Extremadura, Spain.

References

Municipalities in the Province of Cáceres